Matteo Marangoni (12 July 1876 – 1 June 1958) was an Italian art historian, art critic and composer.

Marangoni's art criticism aimed at identifying pure figurative values, in which an artwork's poetic values are identified. His books are positively influenced by the school of Benedetto Croce and Heinrich Wölfflin, clarifying their concepts on the basis of observation and following logic as a science of pure concept.

Life
Born in Florence to Maria Augusta Malvisi and her physics-teacher husband Carlo Marangoni, he took his secondary school diploma in 1896 but did not continue with his studies straight away, instead moving to London to indulge his passion for music. There he performed as a pianist and composed short pieces for voice and piano – Barcarola in 1897, Serenata in 1900, Le pastorelle montanine di Franco Sacchetti in 1901, Tre canti di Giacomo Leopardi in 1902 and Gavotta, also in 1902.

He later returned to Florence and attended the Facoltà di scienze, graduating in 1905 in anthropology. He then moved to Paris and back to London as well as travelling in Germany, becoming interested in the figurative arts. On his second return to Italy in 1909 he took an art history course in Bologna and in 1910 married Drusilla Tanzi, with whom he had a son, Andrea. In the same year as his marriage he became a volunteer at the Superintendency of Arts in Florence, later becoming its inspector (1913) and director. He also taught art history at the Collegio della SS. Annunziata on Poggio Imperiale from 1916 to 1925 and was briefly director of the Pinacoteca di Brera (1920) and the Galleria nazionale di Parma (1924).

During this period he became particularly interested in 17th century art, publishing several articles on that era in the "L'Arte", "Bollettino d'arte", "Dedalo", "Rassegna d'arte", "Rivista d'arte" and "Vita d'Arte" arts reviews. In 1925 the University of Palermo commissioned an art history course from him and the following year became a visiting lecturer at the University of Pisa. In 1927 he published Arte barocca (Baroque Art) and Come si guarda un quadro (How to look at a picture), followed in 1933 by Saper vedere (Knowing how to look). From 1938 he taught art history at the University of Milan, returning to Pisa from 1946 until his retirement in 1951.

In 1953 he published Capire la musica (How to understand music), spending his final years in Pisa, where he also died and where a street is named after him. His last work, a monograph on Guercino, was published in the year after his death

Works 
Il Guercino, Firenze, Fratelli Alinari, 1920
Il Caravaggio, Firenze, Battistelli, 1922
La Basilica di S. Lorenzo in Firenze, Firenze, Battistelli, 1922
La Villa del Poggio Imperiale, Firenze, Fratelli Alinari, 1923
I Carloni, Firenze, Fratelli Alinari, 1925
La Galleria Pitti, Milano, Treves, 1926
Arte barocca, Firenze, Vallecchi, 1927
Come si guarda un quadro, Firenze, Vallecchi, 1927
Saper vedere, Milano-Roma, Treves, Treccani, Tumminelli, 1933
Capire la musica, Milano, Garzanti, 1953
Guercino, Milano, Aldo Martello, 1959
Carteggi (1909–1958), a cura di Luca Barreca, Palermo, Editrice Mediterranea, 2006

References

Italian male pianists
Italian anthropologists
Musicians from Florence
Italian essayists
Male essayists
19th-century Italian composers
20th-century Italian composers
1876 births
1958 deaths
Academic staff of the University of Pisa
Academic staff of the University of Palermo
Academic staff of the University of Milan
Italian art critics
Italian art historians
Italian male non-fiction writers
Writers from Florence
19th-century Italian male musicians
20th-century Italian male musicians